NSYNC (also stylized as *NSYNC or 'N Sync) was an American boy band formed by Chris Kirkpatrick in Orlando, Florida, in 1995 and launched in Germany by BMG Ariola Munich. Their self-titled debut album was successfully released to European countries in 1997, and later debuted in the U.S. market with the single "I Want You Back".

After heavily publicized legal battles with their former manager Lou Pearlman and former record label Bertelsmann Music Group, the group's second album, No Strings Attached (2000), sold over one million copies in one day and 2.4 million copies in one week, which was a record for over fifteen years. NSYNC's first two studio albums were both certified Diamond by the Recording Industry Association of America (RIAA). Celebrity (2001) debuted with 1.8 million copies in its first week in the US. Singles such as "Girlfriend", "Pop" and "Gone" reached the top 10 in several international charts, with the last being a US Billboard Hot 100 number one. In addition to eight Grammy Award nominations, NSYNC performed at the World Series, the Super Bowl and the Olympic Games, and sang or recorded with Elton John, Stevie Wonder, Michael Jackson, Janet Jackson, Britney Spears, Phil Collins, Celine Dion, Aerosmith, Nelly, Lisa "Left Eye" Lopes, Mary J. Blige, country music band Alabama, and Gloria Estefan.

NSYNC last recorded new material in 2002 before undergoing an indefinite hiatus. The five members have reunited occasionally, including at the 2013 MTV Video Music Awards and to receive a star on the Hollywood Walk of Fame in 2018. The band completed five nationwide concert tours and has sold over 70 million records, becoming one of the best-selling boy bands in history. Rolling Stone recognized their instant success as one of the Top 25 Teen Idol Breakout Moments of all time. Justin Timberlake went on to become a ten-time Grammy Award winner throughout his solo career.

History

1995–1997: Formation and debut

Lou Pearlman was introduced to Chris Kirkpatrick by a mutual acquaintance in 1995 and was impressed by his talent, so he immediately picked him up to talk about starting a group. Pearlman promised that he would help finance him if Kirkpatrick could form a group of other young male singers to join him. Kirkpatrick jumped on the opportunity and made some calls, eventually finding Justin Timberlake (who had been on the TV show The Mickey Mouse Club along with JC Chasez) through a talent agent and contacted him about joining his vocal group.

After the end of The Mickey Mouse Club in 1994, Chasez attempted to pursue a music career in Los Angeles, but after feeling cheated, decided to return home to Maryland. On his drive back, he stopped at Timberlake's house in Memphis, Tennessee where the two wrote demos together. Chasez and Timberlake eventually relocated to Nashville while continuously writing songs and demo tracks with Robin Wiley, a songwriter and vocal coach on The Mickey Mouse Club. After Timberlake received a phone call from Kirkpatrick, he decided to join the group, recommending Chasez in the process, who was back home in Maryland saving up to return to Nashville. The trio decided to venture in Orlando, Florida to search for a baritone, where they encountered Joey Fatone, who knew Kirkpatrick from their time working at Universal Studios Florida. The group finally recruited Jason Galasso as their bass singer after several auditions. NSYNC created their name after Timberlake's mother commented on how "in sync" the group's singing voices were. The group's name is also a play on the last letter of each of the initial members' names: JustiN, ChriS, JoeY, JasoN, and JC.

After several weeks of rehearsals, the group set up a showcase and began planning to officially sign with Pearlman's Trans Continental Label. However, at the last minute, Galasso dropped out. He was not fond of the group's musical direction, claiming that being a teen idol was never a goal of his. In need of a bass, the group auditioned several people without success. Timberlake eventually called his vocal coach, who suggested a 16-year-old from Mississippi named Lance Bass. Bass flew to Orlando to audition and was immediately accepted into the group. He was nicknamed "Lansten" so they could keep the name 'NSYNC. From there, Pearlman set the five boys up in a house in Orlando, Florida, where they rehearsed constantly, learning dance routines and vocal parts, and working on promotion for their first public performance at Pleasure Island on October 22, 1995. Pearlman hired Johnny Wright to manage the group, despite also managing the Backstreet Boys. NSYNC sent him a four-song demo-tape including "I'll Be Back for More" and "We Can Work It Out", which impressed him. The group performed for him and a group of BMG executives. Although the record company had some concerns with the band's name and Bass's dancing abilities (which eventually improved), they agreed to sign the group to BMG Ariola Munich with Wright as their manager.

After being signed to BMG Ariola Munich, the group was sent to Sweden to begin working on their debut album with the help of producers such as Denniz Pop, Max Martin and Andreas Carlsson. The album's official lead single, "I Want You Back", was released in Germany on October 7, 1996, and entered the top 10 in Germany on November 18, 1996. With a record deal finally secured, the boys began touring first in German-speaking countries and later in other European and Asian territories. Their self-titled debut album was initially released by BMG Ariola Munich on May 26, 1997, in Germany, and peaked at number one in the second week after its release. The group soon became an overnight success throughout much of Europe. The album also charted successfully in both Switzerland and Austria eventually selling 820,000 units in GSA (Germany, Switzerland, Austria) region and Eastern Europe. The group released its second and third singles, "Tearin' Up My Heart" and "Here We Go", both of which managed to reach the top-10 in numerous countries in Europe. They eventually released the following German exclusive singles, "For the Girl Who Has Everything" and "Together Again" throughout the year.

1998–1999: Breaking the American market and legal battle against Pearlman
NSYNC captured the attention of Vincent DeGiorgio, an A&R rep for RCA Records. After seeing the group perform in Budapest, he eventually signed them to RCA in 1998. The American label had the group record some new tracks to adjust their album for the US market. The group released its debut American single, "I Want You Back" on January 20, 1998. It reached number 13 on the Billboard Hot 100. An album called 'N Sync followed on March 24, 1998. Album sales were sluggish, debuting at number 82 on the Billboard 200, but were helped when the Disney Channel aired a concert special on July 18, 1998. The concert was first offered to the Backstreet Boys, but they had to back out due to member Brian Littrell needing heart surgery, later doing their own special in 1999. Five weeks before the concert, the album sat at number 82 on the albums chart; three weeks after the concert, the album reached number nine. The group's profile continued to rise with the subsequent single release "Tearin' Up My Heart", which became a hit on pop radio and one of the "100 Greatest Songs of the 90s" according to VH1. Regular touring, including an opening spot on Janet Jackson's The Velvet Rope Tour, and television spots on shows like Sabrina the Teenage Witch also bolstered sales for the album, which was eventually certified diamond for shipments in excess of 10 million units.

On November 10, 1998, the group released a holiday album, Home for Christmas. The album peaked at number 7 and sold 2 million copies. With this, NSYNC achieved the rare feat of having two albums in the Billboard Top 10 at the same time. 7 days later on November 16, 1998, NSYNC released The Winter Album in Germany. One of the songs on the album "U Drive Me Crazy" was a major hit in Spain peaking at number 4. The group scored its first top 10 on the Hot 100 with their third single, "(God Must Have Spent) A Little More Time on You", which peaked at number 8 in February 1999. Country group Alabama later re-recorded the song and released it as a single that featured vocals from NSYNC. The fourth and final single from the album, "I Drive Myself Crazy", was a modest chart hit, but a mainstay on Total Request Live. NSYNC also recorded their version of the song “Trashin’ The Camp” with Phil Collins. The song appears on the soundtrack to the Disney movie Tarzan (1999 film). They also did “Somewhere, Someday” which appears on the soundtrack to Pokémon: The First Movie. In September 1999, the group collaborated with Gloria Estefan on a song for the soundtrack for her movie Music of the Heart. The track "Music of My Heart" reached number 2 on Billboard's Top-100 single chart and served as a stopgap between album releases.

In 1999, NSYNC entered a publicized legal battle with Lou Pearlman, due to what the group believed were illicit business practices on his part. NSYNC sued Pearlman and his record company, Trans Continental, for defrauding the group of more than fifty percent of their earnings, rather than his promise of only receiving one-sixth of the profits, similar to his promise of one-sixth of the profits with the Backstreet Boys. The group threatened to leave and sign with Jive Records, which prompted Pearlman and RCA to countersue NSYNC for US$150 million. Trans Continental, along with RCA's parent BMG Entertainment, went to federal court and filed said $150 million suit in an effort to stop NSYNC's move to Jive, to prevent the band from performing or recording under the name NSYNC, and to force NSYNC to return masters recorded that year in preparation of their second album (originally scheduled for release that fall by RCA, the album was then moved to early 2000). The suit also claims Jive executives induced the group into breaking its Trans Continental contract. Pearlman's request for a preliminary injunction against the band was denied. In December 1999, NSYNC and Pearlman reached an undisclosed settlement out of court, freeing the group to release future albums on Jive Records.

Also in 1999, NSYNC starred in a short-form spoof video of the 1998 science fiction disaster film Armageddon for the 1999 MTV Movie & TV Awards; it was titled Armagedd'NSync. It featured an earthbound asterisk-shaped asteroid (a play off the asterisk they usually had in their name at the time) and featured Clint Howard, Lisa Kudrow, and all five members of NSYNC.

2000–2001: No Strings Attached and groundbreaking success
With their legal woes behind them, NSYNC refocused and worked on tracks for its second album. In January 2000, the group released "Bye Bye Bye", an upbeat dance track, which shot into the top 5 of the Hot 100 and spent 5 weeks atop the Hot 100 Airplay chart. The song is often considered the group's signature song.

The accompanying album, No Strings Attached, was released on March 21, 2000. It sold a record 2.42 million in its first week of release. By the end of 2000, it had sold over 9.9 million copies. No Strings Attached was the best-selling album of 2000, and the second-best selling album of the decade in the US behind The Beatles' 1. As of August 2012, No Strings Attached was the eighth best selling album of the SoundScan era, and received a Diamond certification from RIAA for sales of over 11,099,000. The album was all-time bestselling pre-ordered album on Amazon.com.

The second single, "It's Gonna Be Me", became the group's first number one single in the U.S. and remained at the top position on the Billboard Hot 100 from July 29 to August 11, 2000. The third and final single, "This I Promise You" reached the top five on the Billboard Hot 100 chart. They performed the Spanish version of the song "Yo Te Voy Amar" at the Latin Grammys in 2001. The group also embarked on their No Strings Attached Tour that year. The adventures of preparing for the tour were featured on an MTV special "Making the Tour", which was later released on DVD. The tour was then featured on a HBO special, which aired the same week the group's song "It's Gonna Be Me" hit number one on the charts. The group then went on the second leg of the tour in the fall and performed one last show in 2001 for the "Rock in Rio" concert. The group also released Live From Madison Square Garden, a home video release of its HBO Special. NSYNC and Aerosmith co-headlined the Super Bowl XXXV halftime show, titled "The Kings of Rock and Pop", with appearances from Britney Spears, Mary J. Blige and Nelly. NSYNC was among the artists that performed at the 2002 Winter Olympics ceremonies.

2001–2002: Celebrity, hiatus and eventual disbandment

The group's third album, Celebrity, released on July 24, 2001, produced three singles: "Pop" (number 19 in the US), "Gone" (number 11) and "Girlfriend" (number 5). The album featured much more creative involvement from the group, who wrote and produced several of their own tracks.

NSYNC's Celebrity album sold 1,879,955 copies in its first week, making it the second-fastest-selling album in SoundScan history at the time, only behind the group's previous album No Strings Attached. Its debut was recognized by the Billboard Music Awards with a special award for "biggest one-week sales for an album in 2001." To promote the Celebrity album, the group embarked on a four-month stadium tour entitled the PopOdyssey Tour. The tour earned over $90 million, becoming one of the biggest tours of 2001. In 2002, the band promoted their album further by embarking on the Celebrity Tour, which earned nearly $30 million. Following the tour, the group went on a hiatus to allow for time off and at the suggestion of Timberlake, who was interested in recording a solo album and, according to several sources, had already begun working on the project. While the hiatus was initially meant to be temporary, the group never recorded music or toured together again. "It started as a fun snowball fight that was becoming an avalanche. And, also, I was growing out of it. I felt like I cared more about the music than some of the other people in the group. And I felt like I had other music I wanted to make and that I needed to follow my heart," Timberlake later said of his decision to leave the band.

Joey Fatone and Lance Bass have offered a different perspective on *NSYNC disbanding, indicating that a lack of transparency left them unprepared for the prospect of a breakup. In a 2019 interview on The Jenny McCarthy Show, Fatone said the group believed they would be reuniting because they were young and “didn't know better at first.” He then went on to say that the momentum of the Justified album and tour was the reason for prolonging a group reunion that would result in new music. Recalling a conversation he'd had with his bandmates, Fatone elaborated: “I said ‘Listen, I'm all good with everybody doing their own shit. I'm totally fine with it, just let us know next time.’ Meaning: I could’ve done a lot more shit than sit around waiting for your dumb ass while you're going out on tour. I could’ve, honestly. ‘Cause the minute we parted our ways in the sense of a group I was like ‘Shit, I went and did Broadway - I did Rent on Broadway, I did Little Shop of Horrors.’ I started doing things at first, I was waiting ‘cause I know that when you do an album and you're doing stuff with a group it takes a long—it's a long, i-it's a process. So it was interesting. I was just like ‘Dude, just let me know next time,’ I said. ‘Cause next time I ain’t waiting for nobody.”

Lance Bass has also discussed waiting for the band to reunite, first in his memoir when he mentioned passing up various professional opportunities and more recently as a guest on Michael Rosenbaum's ‘Inside of You’ podcast. When asked how he felt about the fallout of *NSYNC's breakup, Bass explained “Me and the guys were never...on bad terms at all, you know, it's just life goes on and y-you know you have more interests; you have to focus on your career and it's great. Uh, the thing I was most disappointed in was not just Justin leaving the band, um... it's that our whole team - our record label, our management, everything like that - they all knew. They all knew it was over for three years before they told me. And so for three years I'm sitting there getting ready for a new album as everyone else knows we’re moving on. And so, I didn't get - I turned down, you know, there was a sitcom I was doin’. Had to turn it down. Uh, I mean, all kinds of stuff that I really wanted to do and focus on but I knew I couldn't because, you know, my first commitment is *NSYNC. Like, this is my life.”

2002–present: Occasional appearances 
The group still attended award shows and events together, and regrouped at the 45th Annual Grammy Awards to sing a televised Bee Gees medley in tribute to that band. They were slated to begin work on a new album in the fall of 2003, but it never materialized. They performed "The Star-Spangled Banner" at the 2004 NSYNC Challenge for Children. According to Bass' 2007 memoir Out of Sync, written after Bass won the Human Rights Campaign Award for his work in the gay community after his coming out, a meeting was held in the summer of 2004 to discuss the band's future where Timberlake announced his decision to leave the band. In 2005, the members regrouped again for the last NSYNC Challenge for the Children, but did not perform. In the fall of 2005, NSYNC released a greatest hits album. It included one song, "I'll Never Stop", that had previously not been released in the US. In 2007, Bass confirmed the group's breakup. In January 2010, the band released another album, The Collection, consisting of singles released only in the UK. On August 25, 2013, the members of NSYNC regrouped for a one-off performance at the 2013 MTV Video Music Awards. They performed a medley of "Girlfriend" and "Bye Bye Bye" during Timberlake's 15-minute set leading up to his acceptance of the Michael Jackson Video Vanguard Award. Their introduction included non-vocal elements of "Gone" in the background. After the performance, Bass said that the group did not have any plans at the moment for a reunion tour or new music.

On July 29, 2014, a compilation of *NSYNC's hits and unreleased songs titled The Essential *NSYNC, was released. Bass said of the album on his radio show, Dirty Pop: "There's a lot of these songs I don't think I've ever heard, I remember recording them but I've never heard them before, so I'm interested in just hearing them." Chasez tweeted about the album's release, stating: "I had the strangest dream last night that some old friends and I had a top 10 record on iTunes. Crazy right..." Kirkpatrick said of the album; "It's great to release some of the songs that had never made a record before. I'm glad our long time fans get some new music." Fatone also said; "Pretty interesting this album comes out, which I really had no idea, and it's in the top of Amazon and iTunes... we owe it to our fans. Thank you."

Fatone and Kirkpatrick starred in Dead 7, a western zombie film written by Backstreet Boys' Nick Carter. The film premiered on April 1, 2016, on the Syfy channel.

On April 30, 2018, NSYNC reunited to receive a star on the Hollywood Walk of Fame. To celebrate the occasion, all five members appeared on The Ellen DeGeneres Show.

On April 14, 2019, Chasez, Fatone, Bass, and Kirkpatrick reunited, for a performance with Ariana Grande during her headlining performance at Coachella. They performed "Break Up with Your Girlfriend, I'm Bored", "It Makes Me Ill" and "Tearin' Up My Heart". Timberlake was unable to make the reunion due to finishing up his The Man of the Woods Tour the night before.

On April 19, 2021, Bass, Fatone, and Kirkpatrick reunited for a Progressive Insurance commercial known as "The 3/5ths of NSYNC".

Artistry
Their debut studio album 'N Sync (1997) featured four-on-the-floor Europop beats with midtempo singles "I Want You Back" and "Tearin' Up My Heart", that recalled a production similar to Ace of Base. No Strings Attached (2000) was noted as "an incremental step away" from teen pop's "softer side", as it featured ballads written by 80s adult contemporary singer Richard Marx and prolific songwriter Diane Warren. Primarily a pop album, it comprised a blend of new jack swing revivalism, uptempo R&B and hip-hop influences. Lyrically, the lead single "Bye Bye Bye"'s kiss-off message and self-assurance saw the group departing from the "lovesick" formula of their debut. Celebrity (2001) was mainly a pop/R&B record with electronica elements.

Marketing
The members licensed their likenesses on a great variety of merchandise, including board games, microphones, lip balm, marionettes, books, key chains, bedding, clothing, video games, and various other articles. The group was immortalized in wax in Madame Tussauds New York wax museum in 2002; all five members of NSYNC were present the day of the unveiling. The group also had a deal alongside McDonald's, which included commercials featuring the group and Britney Spears, along with a CD and a video that featured behind-the-scenes footage from the making of NSYNC's music video. The vocal group also had a deal with Chili's Grill & Bar in which the members appeared in commercials for the restaurant, while Chili's helped sponsor the group's tour. A video game was released based on the band by Infogrames for the Game Boy Color titled *NSYNC: Get to the Show in 2001. In April 2018, a free, limited-run shop called "Dirty Pop-Up" centered in NSYNC opened on Hollywood Boulevard, Los Angeles.

Legacy
Entertainment Weekly ranked NSYNC as the best boy band of the 1990s and 2000s; editor Madelne Boardman stated, "the group has a spot in pop history more than a decade late." The Washington Post stated it was one of the two boy bands "that dominated the late '90s and early '00s." According to Billboard, No Strings Attached was the top album of the 2000s (decade), with The Independent listing it among the albums "that marked the decade." Billboard also ranked the group at number four on their list of the biggest boy bands (from the period 1987–2012) according to chart performance, with the staff writing, "despite having one of the most short-lived boy band careers, 'N Sync was arguably the most famous."

In a retrospective article for No Strings Attacheds 20th anniversary, NPR's writer Maria Sherman said the album marked "the sound of a new millennium" and an "industry peak" commercially, while describing the group as "one of the last artists to benefit so greatly from the industry bubble before its spectacular burst," referring to the following post-9/11 era. Sherman also noted their sophomore album to be relevant to the pop market of 2020: "a union of Swedish pop songcraft with R&B and hip-hop's flow and bounce; an eagerness to explore mature themes and styles; an understanding that dance and visual presentation can turn stars into icons." Billboard stated that their sophomore album's production and writing "represented a sonic shift for all of pop music at the turn of the millennium," while noting, "before No Strings Attached, none of the major teen pop albums of the era had featured guest rappers or name producers from the R&B world, and virtually every one that came after did." Writer Al Shipley commented that although NSYNC was not the first act to build an album "around the theme of taking control of their career", the group took this theme a step further with the No Strings Attached cover art and the "Bye Bye Bye" music video. Shipley further stated the album's pop, hip hop, and R&B elements helped NSYNC "climb to the top of the boy band heap."

A Stereogum article noted the group "were deeply ingrained within the TRL universe", the MTV fan-voted video countdown where they had the most number-one videos for a group and second-most overall, which became "ground zero" for "America's adolescent culture war." The website's editor commented, "to be a teenager at the turn of the millennium was to be inundated with boy bands and pop princesses, and *NSYNC were among the most dominant of them all." As NSYNC propelled the solo stardom of Timberlake, Consequence noted, "[his] solo success is the exception, not the rule", as other contemporary boy bands "failed to produce a solo star." Several acts have cited the group as an influence, including Kelsea Ballerini, Selena Gomez, Meghan Trainor, and Why Don't We. Hayley Williams stated she learned harmonies through listening to the group in her teenage years.

Discography

 'N Sync (1997)
 Home for Christmas (1998)
 No Strings Attached (2000)
 Celebrity (2001)

Filmography

Movies
  NSYNC Bigger Than Live (2001)
 Longshot (2001)
 On the Line (2001) (Joey Fatone and Lance Bass)

TV Specials
 NSYNC In Concert (1998); filmed at Disney's Hollywood Studios at Walt Disney World for Disney Channel in Concert.
 Holidays In Concert (1998); performed songs from Home for Christmas as well as "God Must Have Spent A Little More Time On You" from their debut album.
 NSYNC 'N Concert (1999); pay-per-view concert filmed in Fort Lauderdale, Florida during NSYNC's Ain't No Stoppin' Us Now Tour.
 Walt Disney World Summer Jam Concert (1999); performed along with Britney Spears, Tyrese Gibson and 98 Degrees.
 NSYNC: Live From Madison Square Garden (2000); a concert special presented by HBO during the No Strings Attached Tour.
 Walt Disney World Twas The Night Before Christmas (2000); performed along with 98 Degrees, Monica, Jessica Simpson, Billy Gilman and many others.
 NSYNC Ntimate Holiday Special (2000); a Christmas special on FOX where NSYNC sang songs from No Strings Attached plus “You Don't Have To Be Alone" from the soundtrack to the film How the Grinch Stole Christmas and “O Holy Night” from their album Home for Christmas.
 NSYNC: The Road to Celebrity (2001); an MTV special from San Diego, California where NSYNC sang and previewed songs from their third album Celebrity. The special also included a countdown of the best NSYNC moments on MTV.
 *NSYNC: Live From Atlantis (2001); a Thanksgiving concert special on CBS filmed from Atlantis Paradise Island which aired before an airing of The Rugrats Movie & included duets with & a performance from special guest Tim McGraw.

Guest appearances on TV shows

 Sabrina the Teenage Witch (1998) Episode: “Sabrina And The Pirates”
 Clueless (1999) Episode: “None for the Road”

Note: Tearin Up My Heart was performed in those two shows.

 Touched By An Angel (1999) Episode: “Voice of an Angel” (Also did an a cappella version of God Must Have Spent A Little More Time On You).
 Sesame Street (2000) Episode: “Elmo in Numberland.” Sang a song called “Believe in Yourself”
 Saturday Night Live (2000) Episode: Joshua Jackson/NSYNC. As guest performers and in sketches including as fake boy band No Refund
 The Simpsons (2001) Episode: New Kids on the Blecch Season 12 Episode 14

Tours
Headlining
 For the Girl Tour (1997)
 NSYNC in Concert (1998–2000)
 No Strings Attached Tour (2000)
 PopOdyssey Tour (2001)
 Celebrity Tour (2002)

As supporting act
 The Velvet Rope Tour (supporting Janet Jackson) (1998)

Awards and nominations

NSYNC has been nominated for eight Grammy Awards. Among their awards, the group has won three American Music Awards, five Billboard Music Awards, seven MTV Video Music Awards and they hold a Guinness World Record.

See also
 List of artists who reached number one on the Hot 100 (U.S.)
 List of best-selling music artists in the United States

References

Bibliography

External links

 
 Facebook

 
1995 establishments in Florida
2002 disestablishments in Florida
American boy bands
American dance music groups
American pop music groups
American contemporary R&B musical groups
Avex Group artists
Dance-pop groups
Teen pop groups
Jive Records artists
Justin Timberlake
Lou Pearlman
Musical groups established in 1995
Musical groups disestablished in 2002
Musical groups from Orlando, Florida
RCA Records artists
Sony BMG artists
Vocal quintets
MAMA Award winners